Gwin Dudley Home Site, also known as Twin Chimneys, is a historic home site located at Smith Mountain Lake, Wirtz, Franklin County, Virginia. The site consists of two extant stone chimneys that are situated 31 feet, 8 inches apart (inside face to inside face), indicating the length of the house, which was lost to fire in the early 20th century.  They were part of a house erected about 1795.

A stone tablet, with the initials GD and the date 1795 inlaided into the stone, are prominently display on the south chimney, above the arch.

It was listed on the National Register of Historic Places in 2008.

References

Archaeological sites on the National Register of Historic Places in Virginia
Houses completed in 1795
Houses in Franklin County, Virginia
National Register of Historic Places in Franklin County, Virginia
Houses on the National Register of Historic Places in Virginia